The men's 10000 metres race of the 2015–16 ISU Speed Skating World Cup 2, arranged in the Utah Olympic Oval, in Salt Lake City, United States, was held on November 21, 2015.

Ted-Jan Bloemen of Canada won the race on a new world record, while previous holder Sven Kramer of the Netherlands came second, and Jorrit Bergsma of the Netherlands came third. Bob de Vries of the Netherlands won the Division B race on a time that would have given him second place in Division A.

Results
The race took place on Saturday, November 21, in the afternoon session, with Division A scheduled at 13:00, and Division B scheduled at 17:53.

Division A

Note: WR = world record, NR = national record.

Division B

Note: NR = national record.

References

Men 10000
2